Kotha is a town and Union Council of Swabi District in the North-West Frontier Province of Pakistan. It is located at 34°4'0N 72°35'0E with an altitude of 335 metres (1102 feet).

Kotha has three union councils, a government degree college and another degree college for women under construction. Literacy rate is 99%.

References

Populated places in Swabi District
Union Councils of Swabi District